The Original Jam Sessions 1969 is an album by Quincy Jones and Bill Cosby that was released in 2004. The album was recorded as backing music for The Bill Cosby Show in 1969.

Track listing

Hidden tracks

Personnel
 Quincy Jones - Composer, musical director
 Bill Cosby - Vocals
 Arthur Adams - Guitar
 Eddie Harris - Tenor saxophone
 Ernie Watts - Tenor saxophone
 Clare Fischer - Piano
 Les McCann - Piano
 Monty Alexander - Piano
 Joe Sample - Fender Rhodes piano
 Jimmy Smith - Hammond B-3 organ
 Milt Jackson - Vibraphone
 Victor Feldman - Vibraphone
 Ray Brown - Bass
 Carol Kaye - Electric bass
 John Guerin - Drums
 Paul Humphrey - Drums
 Jimmy Cleveland - Trombone
 Marvin Stamm - Trumpet

Notes

Quincy Jones albums
Albums produced by Quincy Jones
Concord Records albums
2004 albums